The 2013–14 Lamar Lady Cardinals basketball team represented Lamar University during the 2013–14 NCAA Division I women's basketball season. The Lady Cardinals, led by first year head coach Robin Harmony, played their home games at the Montagne Center and are members of the Southland Conference.  The Lady Cardinals finished the season tied for the Southland Conference regular season championship with Stephen F. Austin.  The Lady Cardinals were the Number One seed in the conference tournament because of the conference tie-breaker.  After falling to Northwestern Louisiana in the Conference tournament final game, the Lady Cardinals received and invitation to the WNIT.  The Lady Cardinals played the Southern Mississippi Golden Eagles in Hattiesburg, MS.

Gia Ayers and Dominique Edwards were named to Southland Conference All-Conference teams.  Ayers was named to the First team.  Edwards was named as a member of the Second Team.

Two Lady Cardinal basketball players were named to the Southland Conference All-Academic team.  Dominique Edwards was named to the First Team while JaMeisha Edwards was named to the conference Second Team.

Roster

Schedule

|-
!colspan=9 style="background:#CC2233; color:#FFFFFF;"| Regular Season

|-
!colspan=9 style="background:#CC2233; color:#FFFFFF;"| Southland Conference Tournament

|-
!colspan=9 style="background:#CC2233; color:#FFFFFF;"| Women's National Invitational Tournament (WNIT)

See also
2013–14 Lamar Cardinals basketball team

References

Lamar Lady Cardinals basketball seasons
Lamar
2014 Women's National Invitation Tournament participants
Lamar Lady Cardinals basketball
Lamar Lady Cardinals basketball